Nier Reincarnation is a 2021 role-playing video game developed by Applibot and published by Square Enix for Android and iOS. Set in a realm called the Cage where different characters experience stories while exploring their own troubled situations, the gameplay is split between narrative-driven exploration both in the Cage and within Weapon Stories involving different characters, and turn-based battles against monsters infesting the Cage and its stories.

Production began following the success of Nier: Automata (2017) with the aim of making an accessible mobile entry into the Nier universe. Series creator Yoko Taro acted as creative director, and contributed to the scenario. Other returning staff included producer Yosuke Saito, artists Akihiko Yoshida and Kazuma Koda, co-composer Keiichi Okabe.

Premise and gameplay

Nier Reincarnation is a role-playing video game set in the same universe as Nier and its sequel Nier: Automata, taking place at an unspecified time within an infinite area of towers dubbed the Cage. The game covers multiple story arcs of varying length following different characters within the Cage. The player navigates different areas of the Cage in the company of ghost-like companions, entering statues called Scarecrows and reliving memories which play out as storybook-like narratives.

The gameplay is split into three types. The first is the current protagonist exploring different areas of the Cage with their companion. During this exploration, they come across Scarecrows which grant and upgrade weapons used to fight enemies within unlocked memories. In these memories, dubbed Weapon Stories, players experience the memories of those related to a weapon from a side-scrolling painting-like perspective, entering battles to correct errors in the memories. Battles play out in real-time inside the memories with a party of three characters against enemies, with special attacks utilized by tapping icons on-screen when they have charged. Battles can be performed manually or completed through an auto-battle function.

At launch, Nier Reincarnation included a minigame where the player shoots at targets within a time limit. The shooter is locked to a horizontal axis, and being hit by projectiles from the targets will freeze them temporarily. The player is ranked based on points gained from defeating targets, impacting their reward. An alternate minigame was added post-launch which has players controlling the supporting character Mama in an autoscrolling side-scroller. The goal is to avoid obstacles and find coins within the time limit, with items granting buffs and enemies which will decrease the player score if Mama is hit. An Arena mode added post-launch allowed a player's party to fight an opposing party created by another player, granting weapon and character enhancement rewards.

While the storyline characters are present in-game from the outset, other character variations and weapons are obtained through a gacha mechanic. Storyline quests, when completed, unlock optional harder versions of their battles. The player also has a strength statistic for their party members dubbed "Force", with the party's Force needing to be a certain threshold to progress the story. The Force requirements were adjusted following the initial story arc.

Development
After the success of Nier Automata (2017), the concept of a mobile title based on the Nier universe was pitched by series owner Square Enix to external developers, with the aim of creating a game that would bring in new casual players. Nier Reincarnation was developed by Applibot and Square Enix. Series creator Yoko Taro acted as creative director, with Saito acting as co-producer. Applibot's Daichi Matsukawa acted as co-producer and co-director. The team's aim was to make an ambitious title with 3D graphics comparable to a cross-platform title. This approach was partially intended to carry stronger appeal to Western players. It was also designed to carry over the established aesthetic and musical style of Nier. A development challenge was getting the game to work within different phone specifications. During production, it used the codename "Dark".

The gameplay was designed to look like the automatic mode of Nier Automata. Due to Matsukawa finding smartphone controls difficult to use, the interface was simplified by making battles turn-based. The shooting sections, directly inspired by the hacking mechanic of Automata, were included at Matsukawa's insistence. Speaking about the gacha incorporation, Yoko stated that he understood the need for inclusion despite neither understanding the business end or partaking in those designs, but kept up active communication with the staff so he could create the game he wanted within those constraints. During its later development, the team tweaked the game's design and functions to improve playability and accessibility.

While the game is within the same universe as the other Nier titles, Yoko wanted to separate the game from the others so it could be enjoyed by newcomers. Matsukawa later stated that Yoko had not finalized the game's placement in the chronology of Nier beyond a rough outline. In contrast to the other Nier titles, the writing was handled a team of other writers, with Yoko's role being to take their ideas and create a coherent plot out of them. The team was led by Takashi Ohara, who also acted as lead writer under Yoko's direction. Mama's companion role in the story was compared by Yoko to the Grimoires in Nier and the Pods in Automata. The multiple protagonists and story structure were based on the progression of Puzzle & Dragons. The short story structure was built around short stories to alleviate Yoko's frustration at needing to extend his earlier mobile game SINoALICE beyond its planned finale due to its popularity, also meaning it could end prematurely despite him having an overall finale in mind. The second arc was written by Yuki Wada based on a draft by Yoko.

The main characters were designed by Akihiko Yoshida, while background and concept artwork was designed by Kazuma Koda. The muted color palette was chosen as it fitted the overall aesthetic of the Nier universe. While the main game used 3D graphics, the Weapon Stories used a side-scrolling style with recitation-based narration based on kamishibai. Matsukawa originally wanted static picture book presentation, with this instead being used for collaboration storylines. The characters for the second arc were designed by an unnamed artist under Yoshida's supervision, and the visual theme was "metal" as opposed to the natural style of the first arc. The leads were designed to contrast each other, using the series' recurring black and white color scheme with gold accents to unify them. The in-game movie production was supported by Kanaban Graphics.

Music

The music was handled by Keiichi Okabe, lead composer for the other Nier titles. Okabe's contribution was around twenty songs, all original and not incorporating music from earlier Nier titles. On Yoko's request, each song covered a variety of styles while maintaining the established atmosphere of the Nier universe. The musical style was influenced by the game's "nostalgic" atmosphere, gaining an atmosphere compared to fairy tales. Rather than having strong melodies, the music was designed to be "smooth". For the second story arc, new music was written focusing on strings and woodwinds to match the change to the atmosphere. A soundtrack album was released on April 21, 2021 and contains 18 tracks from the initial release, 13 of which were composed by Okabe and 5 by fellow MONACA composer Shotaro Seo.

Release
The game was first announced in March 2020 alongside a remaster of the original Nier. A closed beta test ran from July to August of that year. Pre-registration opened in September. While originally planned for a 2020 release, Square Enix delayed its Japanese debut into the first half of 2021. Following the beta period, full voice acting for the story sections was still an unknown, but fan feedback persuaded the team to include full voice acting despite the technical difficulties. The game released in Japan on February 21, 2021.

A Western release was announced alongside its pre-registration date. The game's UI was designed around that from the start, with a translation challenge being fitting English versions of the dialogue into the text boxes. The localization was handled by 8-4, which had handled the previous Nier titles. Localization was ongoing in February 2021, with the aim being to both translate and voice the game in English, and fix bugs in the Japanese version so it could be released in its best condition. The localization went through final adjustments in  early May. A beta test for the English version ran from May 26 to June 1. It was released in English on July 28.

The first story arc, "The Girl and the Monster", was completed during 2021 with twelve episodes. The second story arc, "The Sun and the Moon", began releasing in October 2021. The second arc is scheduled to end in January 2023 with six episodes, with planned changes to the game and story following that. Alongside the main episodes, multiple collaborations with other games were released as limited time events. The game initially launched with a collaboration with Nier: Automata. Later collaborations appeared with the Nier Replicant remaster, Drakengard 3, Final Fantasy XIV, Persona 5, and SINoALICE.

Reception

When pre-registration opened for the Western release, it exceeded 300,000 applications.

The game has been praised for its beautiful art and music, along with a well written story. However, issues that plague other Japanese mobile games such are also present, such as dull and repetitive combat, and overbearing gatcha mechanics. The menu has also been a source of confusion for some players.

Notes

References

External links

Android (operating system) games
Drakengard
Free-to-play video games
IOS games
Role-playing video games
Square Enix games
Video game spin-offs
Video games developed in Japan
Video games featuring female protagonists
Gacha games